is a  Japanese manga artist. His real name is pronounced the same way, but is written with the kanji . He graduated from Niigata Prefectural Muramatsu High School two years prior to Yoshifumi Kondō. After graduation, he attended Wakō University where he studied fine arts.

In 1972, Yanagisawa won an honorable mention in the 4th Tezuka Shō Manga Story contest for his story Makeru na Kisaburō (submitted under his real name). His contemporary, Kazuhito Kurosaki, also won second place in the same contest. In 1978, he won the 3rd Kodansha Manga Award for shōnen for Tonda Couple.

Bibliography

Manga

References

External links
 
 
 Ketteiban! Yanagisawa Kimio World! 

1948 births
Living people
Manga artists from Niigata Prefecture
Winner of Kodansha Manga Award (Shōnen)